Play Radio UK was a British internet radio station based on the South Coast of England. Its output comprised two mainstream music radio streams, a talk radio stream, and several other genre-specific music streams. On 4 July 2009, Play Radio UK launched an FM service in Southampton and Winchester.

Liquidation 

Play Radio UK went into liquidation at 10:00 a.m. on Friday 18 September 2009, although the Southampton services are operated under a separate company and (as of 1 October 2009) are not affected. The company was part directed by David Reynolds, who was charged with £1.2million tax fraud in June 2008, and was part of Something.info. The FM licences and assets were acquired by Celador. The FM stations were renamed The Breeze. The Play Radio brand and trademarks were sold on to Aiir

History 

The service was broadcast from a converted barn in Ford, a small village near Arundel, West Sussex. The building also hosted Dave Reynolds' other companies, including Satellite Direct and Something.info. The first three stations were launched in October 2006 with a mainstream music radio format. Later, further genre-specific music streams were added.

On 8 June 2009 Play Radio announced it had won the rights to the Southampton and Winchester FM licences on 107.2FM and 107.8FM. This service was launched on 4 July and carries a mixture of live local programming and live "networking" with their online stations.

Stations 

Play One UK
Play Two UK
Play Talk UK
Play Rock UK
Play Classical UK
Play Gold UK
Play Love UK

Play Dance UK
Play Country UK
Play Urban UK
Play Top 40 UK
Play Rock UK
Play Jazz UK
Play Reggae UK

Play Talk UK 

Tommy Boyd joined the station in 2007 with Play Radio's first talk-based show, a Sunday night phone-in programme. The station expanded its talk output in 2008, with the arrival of former Talksport presenters James Whale
and Mike Mendoza
.

At Easter 2008, Richard Hearsey began Hearsey's Half Hour, a two-hour programme. The title was suggested by comedian and actor Tim Vine. It was a chat and music show with special celebrity guests including Tim Vine, Chris Tarrant, Shaun Williamson, Alex Lowe, Bobby Davro, and Steve Nallon.

In March 2009, the station's talk output was moved from Play Two UK, to a new dedicated stream, Play Talk UK. Play Talk UK was the creation of Tommy Boyd, The intention was to create a 24/7 schedule of unregulated talk radio. In the process of expanding the hours of broadcast, new presenters were added to the Play Talk UK schedule.

In July 2009, Play Talk ceased broadcasting after its successful pilot test phase, due to lack of financial support. At the same time, the other online stations all became music-only services.

Notable presenters

Play Radio UK
Pat Sharp (now with Greatest Hits Radio)
James Whale (now with Talkradio)

Play Talk UK
Duncan Barkes
Iain Dale
Iain Lee
John Radford
Simon Darby
Tommy Boyd

References

Internet radio stations in the United Kingdom